Jacob Keller Farm, also known as the Covered Bridge Inn-Bed and Breakfast, is a historic home and grist mill located at Ephrata Township, Lancaster County, Pennsylvania. The original section of the house was built in 1814, and is a -story, five bay wide, limestone Federal and Germanic style dwelling.  A two-story, three bay frame addition was built about 1856.  The Rettew's Mill or Aaron Roller Mill is a stone mill built about 1814.  The property also includes the stone foundation of a barn also built about 1814.

It was listed on the National Register of Historic Places in 1986.

References

External links

Houses on the National Register of Historic Places in Pennsylvania
Federal architecture in Pennsylvania
Houses completed in 1856
Houses in Lancaster County, Pennsylvania
National Register of Historic Places in Lancaster County, Pennsylvania